Giovanni Maria Conti, also called Giovanni dalla Camera  (Parma, active 1617–1670) was an Italian painter active during the Baroque period in Parma.

Biography
He painted the monochrome decoration on the pilasters of the Sanctuary of the Steccata; worked in the church of the Cappuccine; Santa Maria del Quartiere; and Santa Croce. In the latter church, his fresco work was aided by  Francesco Reti and Antonio Lombardi. He painted for the church of Sant'Alessandro and the Oratory of Sant'Ilario.

References

1617 births
1670 deaths
17th-century Italian painters
Italian male painters
Painters from Parma
Italian Baroque painters